Brooklyn High School is a public high school located in Brooklyn, Ohio.  It is the only high school in the Brooklyn City School District.

The school colors are royal blue and gold.  The sports teams are named the Hurricanes or the 'Canes (Hurcs was also used as a nickname in the past).  Athletically, the school is a member of the Chagrin Valley Conference (CVC), and a member of the Greater Cleveland High School Hockey League (GCHSHL) for Hockey. The school was designated a Historic Rock and Roll Landmark in 1998 by the Rock and Roll Hall of Fame and Museum.

Hockey
In the 2008-2009 season, under its new coach, the team finished with a perfect 10-0-0 record in the GCHSHL's Blue Central Division, and went on to its first Conference Championship since 1993.  This marked a major turnaround from the 2006-2007 season when the Hurricanes lost all 27 of their games, many by blowout scorelines such as 26-0 and 21-1. In 2017 under Coach Ryan Kelber, the Canes went 12-0 in league play, collecting a Blue South Divisions title. The team then went on to win 2 more Blue South Division Titles in the next 2 years

Marching band
The Brooklyn Hurricane Marching Band, established in 1947, is a staple in the community. Approximately 25% of the high school student body is made up of marching band members. There has been an array of band directors with a different variety of marching styles. Currently the director is Mr. Sean Sullivan, with assistant director Robert Black, as well as Hurricette dance line advisor Kristen Sullivan. The band performs a wide variety of songs - classics such as "The Music of the Night" (2009) from the Phantom of the Opera, the popular Shaker hymn "Simple Gifts" (2005), or Beethoven's "Ode to Joy" (2008), to the official 2007 NBA song, "Right Now". The 2010 season featured songs such as "Thanks for the Memories" by Fall Out Boy, "Rhythm is Gonna Get You", "I'm Walking on Sunshine", and "Trooper Salute". The band has performed in the Magic Music Days program at Walt Disney World Resort in Lake Buena Vista, Florida in 2007, 2010, 2014, and most recently, 2018. The band also performed at the city's annual Home Days Festival before its cancellation in 2008. The band performs at many shows, band festivals, and competitions and is considered one of the most active bands in the conference.

Elvis visit
The school gained notoriety on October 20, 1955, when Elvis Presley performed in their auditorium. It was the first ever concert Elvis performed in the northern United States. It is also believed to be the first filmed concert in Elvis' career. It would be nearly a year before he appeared on The Ed Sullivan Show for the first time.

Elvis was not the headliner at the concert organized by legendary Cleveland DJ Bill Randle.  The other, more popular performers were Bill Haley & His Comets, The Four Lads, and Pat Boone.

On October 20, 2005, some of the acts returned to participate in an anniversary event for this visit. Among the acts were Priscilla Wright and Bill Haley's Original Comets. The BHS Chorale also performed a song with Priscilla Wright.

Notable alumni
 Clint Nageotte, Former MLB player (Seattle Mariners)

References

External links
 District website

High schools in Cuyahoga County, Ohio
Public high schools in Ohio